Juan José Martín-Delgado Muñiz (born 13 December 1949), known as Martín Delgado, is a Spanish football manager.

Managerial career
Born in Toledo, Castile-La Mancha, Martín Delgado started working in Getafe CF's youth categories before moving to Real Madrid. After the arrival of Jupp Heynckes, he was appointed assistant manager of the main squad.

Martín Delgado subsequently followed Heynckes at S.L. Benfica and Athletic Bilbao, both as an assistant. On 5 February 2004 he was named manager of Segunda División side CD Leganés, but failed to retain its division status and was subsequently sacked.

On 8 January 2005 Martín Delgado was appointed at the helm of Deportivo Alavés B, in Segunda División B. On 30 June, after taking the club to a comfortable mid-position, he resigned and was named manager of CD Castellón in the second tier, replacing fired Álvaro Cervera.

On 30 October 2005, after achieving only one win out of ten matches, Martín Delgado was relieved from his duties. He only returned to action in December 2008, after being appointed at CD Colonia Ofigevi.

References

External links

1949 births
Living people
Sportspeople from Toledo, Spain
Spanish football managers
Segunda División managers
CD Leganés managers
CD Castellón managers